Matthew Paul Walsh (born October 13, 1964) is an American comedian and actor, best known for his role as Mike McLintock in Veep for which he received two Primetime Emmy Award nominations. He is a founding member of the Upright Citizens Brigade sketch comedy troupe, with which he co-starred in the original television series and the 2015 reboot. He also previously starred in short-lived comedy programs such as Dog Bites Man and Players, and was a correspondent on The Daily Show with Jon Stewart. He has also appeared in films such as Road Trip (2000), Bad Santa (2003), School for Scoundrels (2006), Role Models (2008), The Hangover (2009) and The Do-Over (2016).

Early life
Walsh was born in Chicago, the fourth of seven children of Dick and Audrey Walsh. He graduated from Hinsdale South High School in 1982. While in high school he played on the football team as a backup tight end. He attended Northern Illinois University, where he graduated with a degree in Psychology, also spending a year studying abroad in Austria at Salzburg College.

Career
After college, Walsh took improvisational comedy classes in Chicago, where he became a regular performer at the Annoyance Theater and ImprovOlympic, and studied under Del Close. In 1991, he met comedian Matt Besser, with whom he began performing stand-up comedy. Along with Matt Besser, Amy Poehler, and Ian Roberts, he is a founding member of the Upright Citizens Brigade improv comedy troupe and played "Trotter" in the troupe's sketch comedy series, which ran for three seasons on Comedy Central. Before the show, the UCB comedy foursome had already been doing improv shows at their theatre in New York, which used to be a burlesque house before they remodeled it to become a theatre. To date, they have founded four successful Upright Citizens Brigade comedy theaters located in New York at UCB Chelsea and The East Village UCB, and Los Angeles with UCB Franklin and UCB Sunset.

Besides his sketch work with the Upright Citizens Brigade, Walsh is also known for his memorable supporting roles in popular comedy films in recent years including Old School, Starsky & Hutch, Be Kind Rewind, Ted, and Keeping Up with the Joneses. Walsh also wrote and starred in the cult indie-comedy Martin & Orloff, especially The Hangover. In The Hangover, he plays a doctor who, when asked directions, replies, "It's at the corner of 'get a Map' and 'Go F__ yourself.'" In addition, he was also a correspondent on The Daily Show from 2001 to 2002, and made regular appearances in comedy sketches on Late Night with Conan O'Brien and MTV's Human Giant as well as starring in the Comedy Central mockumentary series Dog Bites Man in the summer of 2006. Walsh has the distinction of having appeared in several Todd Phillips comedy films, most often playing characters aptly named "Walsh".

In 2010, Walsh created the improvised comedy series Players for Spike TV. Walsh (creator, writer, director and executive producer of the show) stars in the series alongside his Upright Citizens Brigade partner Ian Roberts, as two brothers who run a sports bar together. The show aired for one season, concluding on August 14, 2010.

Walsh currently hosts the podcast Bear Down with comedian Scot Armstrong (screenwriter of Old School) where they discuss their favorite football team The Chicago Bears and do sports-themed comedy bits such as fake call-ins and in-character interviews. The podcast has also featured appearances by comedians such as Horatio Sanz, Ian Roberts, Joseph Nunez, and Matt Price.

In 2010, Walsh had recurring roles on the NBC comedy series Outsourced and on the HBO comedy series Hung. In 2012, he began co-starring as Mike McLintock in the HBO series Veep, for which he was nominated for the Primetime Emmy Award for Outstanding Supporting Actor in a Comedy Series in 2016 and 2017. During that year, Walsh portrayed J. R. R. Tolkien in The Dead Authors Podcast.

Walsh directed his first feature film High Road, an indie-comedy he co-wrote with Josh Weiner. The film was released on March 6, 2012. Walsh co-wrote his second film, A Better You, with Brian Huskey, who also stars in the film.

In the movie Into the Storm, Walsh stars as Pete Moore, who is the driver of the Tornado Intercept Vehicle nicknamed "Titus."

He appeared in the MyCareer mode in the basketball simulation game NBA 2K17.

Filmography

Film

Television

References

External links

Audio interview on The Sound of Young America: MP3 Link
Interviewed by Josh Fulton on Improv Resource Center

1964 births
Living people
Male actors from Chicago
American male film actors
American film directors
American podcasters
American male screenwriters
American stand-up comedians
American male television actors
American television directors
American television writers
American male voice actors
Northern Illinois University alumni
20th-century American male actors
21st-century American male actors
American sketch comedians
American male television writers
Upright Citizens Brigade Theater performers
Screenwriters from Illinois
Comedians from Illinois
20th-century American comedians
21st-century American comedians
American game show hosts